Scott Heiner is an American politician and Republican member of the Wyoming House of Representatives, representing the 18th district since January 12, 2021.

Career
On August 18, 2020, Heiner defeated incumbent state representative, Thomas Crank, in the Republican primary for the Wyoming House of Representatives seat representing the 18th district by ten votes. He had challenged Crank twice before. On November 3, 2020, Heiner was elected to this position, unopposed. Heiner was sworn in on January 4, 2021.

Personal life
Heiner lives in Green River, Wyoming. He has a wife named Paula, 7 children, and 2 grandchildren. He is Mormon.

References

Living people
Republican Party members of the Wyoming House of Representatives
People from Green River, Wyoming
21st-century American politicians
Year of birth missing (living people)